Zuzana Kučová (born 26 June 1982) is a former Slovak tennis player.

She won eight singles titles and four doubles titles on the ITF Women's Circuit. On 7 June 2010, she reached her best singles ranking of world No. 101. In December 2009, she peaked at No. 175 in the WTA doubles rankings. She is the sister of Kristína Kučová, also professional tennis player.

Career
Kučová qualified for the 2004 French Open, and drew 10th seed Vera Zvonareva in the first round of the clay-court tournament. She struggled to find a way past the Russian and was beaten in straight sets.

In 2008, Kučová competed at the 2008 GDF Suez Grand Prix in Budapest, Hungary. She knocked young Swiss player Timea Bacsinszky out of the tournament in the opening round, but failed to defeat hometown favourite Gréta Arn in the second, bowing out in straight sets.

Kučová qualified for her second Grand Slam championship, the 2010 Australian Open, by beating Julia Schruff in the third round of qualifying. She drew Gisela Dulko in the opening round, and after a first set shocker that lasted just 18 minutes, Kučová fought back, but was ultimately knocked out in three sets. Following 18 months absent from the tennis court, Kučová qualified for her first Grand Slam main-draw appearance in three years at the 2013 French Open. There, she caused a huge upset by defeating 24th seed Julia Görges in straight sets. In the second round, she lost to Virginie Razzano in three sets. Her last professional tournament was at the 2013 French Open.

ITF finals

Singles: 24 (8–16)

Doubles: 8 (4–4)

Grand Slam singles performance timeline

References

External links

 
 
 Zuzana Kučová at CoreTennis.net

1982 births
Living people
Tennis players from Bratislava
Slovak female tennis players